She Was a Lady is a 1934 American drama film directed by Hamilton MacFadden and written by Gertrude Purcell. It is based on the 1934 novel She Was a Lady by Elisabeth Cobb. The film stars Helen Twelvetrees, Donald Woods, Ralph Morgan, Monroe Owsley, Irving Pichel and Doris Lloyd. The film was released on August 22, 1934, by Fox Film Corporation.

Plot

Cast    
Helen Twelvetrees as Sheila Vane
Donald Woods as Tommy Traill
Ralph Morgan as Stanley Vane
Monroe Owsley as Jerry Couzins
Irving Pichel as Marco
Doris Lloyd as Alice Vane
Kitty Kelly as Daisy
Halliwell Hobbes as George Dane
Mary Forbes as Lady Diana Vane
Jackie Searl as Herbie Vane
Barbara Weeks as Moira
Karol Kay as Sheila 
Paul Harvey as Jeff Dyer
Harold Goodwin as Yank
Anne Howard as Iris Vane

References

External links
 

1934 films
American drama films
1934 drama films
Fox Film films
Films directed by Hamilton MacFadden
American black-and-white films
1930s English-language films
1930s American films